Wroxeter, Ontario is a community in Howick Township, part of Huron County.

The first settlers of Wroxeter were the Gibson Brothers, Thomas and Robert, who founded the community in the mid-19th century. During its peak period, Wroxeter had five general stores, five hotels, two schools (which ran until 1950), a library, a woolen mill, and a grist mill, and an arena, which ran until it was torn down in the late '70s. Wroxeter also had a railway which was completed in 1874, when a train station was constructed to connect the village to the Toronto area. The population of Wroxeter in the late 19th century is estimated to have been 700–800 people.

Today, Wroxeter's old industries have vanished. In 1948, the Township of Howick made Wroxeter an unincorporated village.

Climate

See also

 List of unincorporated communities in Ontario

References

Communities in Huron County, Ontario